Camer Country Park is in Meopham, in Kent, England. It is a former estate landscape, with grassland and woodland.

History
This park was originally the country estate of the Smith-Masters family. It was one of the largest estates in Meopham, where there had been a farmstead in the area since the 13th century. The estate reached its peak size in the 18th and 19th centuries under the Smith-Masters.
The family included William Smith-Masters, an English cricketer, who died in Meopham on 27 August 1937. The last known resident was Kate (or Catherine) Smith-Masters. Her son George Smith then inherited the estate. He kept the house but sold the rest of the estate, and it was bought in 1967 by the Strood Rural District Council, for the sum of £9,750.

The council converted the estate into a Country Park.
It was opened in the early 1970s by Kent County Council, who still manages it.

The Smith-Masters estate house (a Grade II listed building) was built in 1716. It still exists in private hands and can be seen from the park.

Walking in the park
Visitors to the park can choose to either wander at ease admiring the variety of original trees of the mature parkland or go on one of the series of walks devised by Meopham Footpaths Group through the adjoining woodland of the park.

The book A Year of Walks, Kent has an  walk starting in the park car park and leading through the estate to Meopham, Harvel, Luddesdown, Cobham and back to the park.

Common lizards (such as lacerta vivipara) and slowworms (Anguis fragilis) can be found in the park.

How to get there
From the A2 dual carriageway near Gravesend, take the A227 towards Wrotham. Pass through the village of Meopham and turn left into Green Lane and turn right into Camer Park Road. It has a free entry car park.

References

Country parks in Kent
Parks and open spaces in Kent